Jassim Al-Nabhan (Arabic: جاسم النبهان; born August 1, 1944), Kuwaiti actor.

Works

Plays 
jonon wa fonon (1965)
hami al diyar (1985)
rahii (1992)
Richard III: An Arab Tragedy (2009)

Series TV 
al al dinya al salam (1987)
mizan al adala (1994)
niran (2000)

Movies 
Trap (1983)
cute (2008)

Dubbing 
Future Boy Conan as Dyce
The Rose of Versailles
Dinosaur War Izenborg

References

1944 births
Living people
Kuwaiti male actors
Kuwaiti male stage actors
Kuwaiti male film actors
20th-century Kuwaiti male actors
21st-century Kuwaiti male actors